The 1928 United States Senate election in Connecticut was held on November 6, 1928. Incumbent Republican Senator George P. McLean was not a candidate for re-election. In his place, Republican State Senator Frederic C. Walcott won the seat against  former U.S. Representative Augustine Lonergan.

General election

Candidates
Augustine Lonergan, former U.S. Representative from Hartford
Martin F. Plunkett (Socialist)
Frederic C. Walcott, State Senator from Norfolk (Republican)

Results

Aftermath
Lonergan would win an election to Connecticut's other Senate seat in 1932; he and Walcott served as colleagues in the Senate from 1933 to 1935.

References

Connecticut
1928
1928 Connecticut elections